Scipio is an unincorporated community and census-designated place (CDP) in Geneva Township, Jennings County, Indiana, United States. As of the 2010 census it had a population of 153.

History
Scipio was laid out in 1839 and named for Scipio Africanus.

Geography
Indiana State Road 7 passes through the center of the community, leading southeast  to North Vernon and northwest  to Columbus.

Sand Creek, a west-flowing tributary of the East Fork of the White River, forms the northern edge of the CDP.

Demographics

References

Unincorporated communities in Jennings County, Indiana
Unincorporated communities in Indiana
Census-designated places in Jennings County, Indiana
Census-designated places in Indiana